Pa Kalan is a commune in Veun Sai District in northeast Cambodia. It contains two villages and has a population of 943. In the 2007 commune council elections, four seats went to members of the Cambodian People's Party and one seat went to a member of Funcinpec. Land alienation is a problem of low severity in Pa Kalan. (See Ratanakiri Province for background information on land alienation.)

Villages

References

Communes of Ratanakiri province